Essa Abbas Faleh Hashem (born 8 January 1960) is a Kuwaiti long jumper. He competed in the 1980 Summer Olympics.

References

1960 births
Living people
Athletes (track and field) at the 1980 Summer Olympics
Kuwaiti male long jumpers
Olympic athletes of Kuwait